Timber Tower may refer to:

 Plyscraper, a skyscraper constructed (at least partly) out of wood, occasionally referred to as a Timber Tower.
 Timber Tower, a now replaced amusement park ride in Dollywood.
 Merritt Island Launch Area Radar Range Boresight Tower